A Couta boat is a type of sailing boat originally designed and built in Victoria, Australia, around Sorrento, Queenscliff and along Victoria's west coast as far west as Portland.  It was originally used as a traditional fishing boat from around 1870 until the 1930s, although it survived as a commercial fishing vessel until the 1950s. From the 1970s onwards a community of enthusiasts started restoring old couta boats to use recreationally.

History

As a fishing vessel 
The couta boat was developed for the coastal fishing industry over the later part of the 19th century. Fishermen chased fish often incorrectly identified as 'Barracouta'; a confusion with the larger ocean barracuda species. Couta boats caught the species "Thyrsites atun" but fishing cooperatives established quotas to control prices, and it was this that led to the added requirement of speed in a good fishing boat.

The boats headed out to the fishing grounds before dawn, most often through the entrance to Port Phillip, the infamous and often treacherous Rip, where the couta boats’ qualities of seaworthiness were proven. Once their quota of Barracouta was met, the fishermen turned their efforts to sailing back to port as fast as they could — the first boat back got the best prices.

Although load carrying capacity was important, the need for speed under sail was also a desired characteristic. The typical couta boat carried a gaff sail and jib set out on a long bowsprit, although the main sail developed into more of a gunter sail, as it had a very high peaked gaff or yard. A rig peculiar to the couta boat evolved, which allowed for sail to be carried much higher than previously, and included the distinctive curved down bowsprit.

As efficient and competitive commercial fishing vessels, couta boats reached their peak around the 1920s and 1930s. After World War II, the development of engines and the public’s growing preference for shark started to push the couta boat from centre stage.

As a recreational sailing boat  
The couta boat became a victim of the modernisation of the fishing industry after World War II, and survives due only to the efforts of a small group of individuals with a keen sense of history and admiration for working maritime traditions. Regretting the apparent inevitability that these distinctive boats would be relegated to the status of a footnote to Australia’s seafaring history and perhaps vanish into obscurity, from the late 1970s onwards, a few dedicated unsung heroes sought and restored the remaining original couta boats that were either still afloat or propped up in backyards along the coast. Whilst never receiving formal recognition, their heroic deeds are forever cemented in the Australian psyche.

This working fishing craft’s compromise between seaworthiness, speed and capacity has made it a quintessential recreational sailing boat nowadays. Couta boats are highly sought after and keenly compete in races. Many are built new from scratch, as the supply of originals has been exhausted. There is a couta boat club in Sorrento and another in Queenscliff.

Early Examples

Thistle,  one of the oldest surviving examples of a couta boat was designed and built around 1903 by JR Jones in Victoria.  She was purchased in 1987 and restored by Tim Phillips for the Australian National Maritime Museum and went on display in 1990.

References

External links
Comprehensive book
Official club website
Specifications
Sydney Harbour Couta Boats

Sailboat types
Types of fishing vessels